Antonio Somma (28 August 1809, Udine – 8 August 1864, Venice) was an Italian playwright who is most well known for writing the libretto of an opera which ultimately became Giuseppe Verdi's Un ballo in maschera in 1859. While a student, his tragedy, Parisina, gave him quite a success.

Initially, his contact with Verdi came about when the composer was seeking to continue work on his proposed Re Lear, an adaptation of the Shakespeare play, King Lear, for the opera stage which had begun under his long-time collaborator Salvadore Cammarano who had died.  Under Verdi's supervision, Somma  wrote the libretto for Re Lear, a project that Verdi never realised musically although extensive work was done and a full libretto completed to the point where Verdi was considering this to be the opera he wrote for Naples for the 1858 season.

However, Ballo had a troubled history and, originally, Somma wrote the libretto under the title of Gustavo III.  As a result of required changes by, firstly, the Bourbon censors and, then, the Papal ones, it became transformed into Un vendetta in domino (with a different setting and characters' names).

Finally, for its Rome premiere, the opera became Un ballo in maschera, but with another location change (this time to Boston in colonial times) and further title and name changes.
 
Overall, Somma then specialized in stage plays and wrote no further libretti.

References
Notes

Sources
Antonio Somma Bio at OperaGlass.
Budden, Julian (1984), "Un ballo in maschera", The Operas of Verdi, Volume 2. London: Cassell, Ltd., pp. 360–423. 
Gossett, Philip (2006), Divas and Scholars: Performing Italian Opera Chicago: University of Chicago.   
Schmidgall, Gary (1985), "Verdi's King Lear Project", 19th-Century Music, Vol. 9, No. 2, pp. 83–101 
Werfel, Franz and Paul Stefan (ed. & selected; trans. Edward Downes) (1973), Verdi: The Man and His Letters, New York: Vienna House. 

1809 births
1864 deaths
Italian opera librettists
Italian dramatists and playwrights
People from Udine
Italian male dramatists and playwrights
19th-century Italian dramatists and playwrights
19th-century Italian male writers